Meendum Oru Kadhal Kadhai is a 2016 Tamil-language musical romance film directed by Mithran R. Jawahar, starring Walter Philips and Isha Talwar. It is a remake of the Malayalam film Thattathin Marayathu.

Plot 
The film is the story of Vinod (Walter Philips) and Aisha (Isha Talwar), belonging to Hinduism and Islam respectively, falling in love, and the conflict arising out between them.

Cast 

 Walter Phillips as Vinod
 Isha Talwar as Aisha
 Nassar as Abdul Kader
 Som Shekar as Musthafa
 Thalaivasal Vijay as Abdul Rahman
 Manoj K. Jayan as S.I.
 Arjunan as Abdul Razak (Abu)
 Vanitha Krishnachandran as Vinod's mother
 Durga Premjith as Asma, the teacher's kid
 Shan as Imran
 Venkatesh Harinathan as Altaf
 Vidyullekha Raman as Hamzah
 Singamuthu as Police
 Sangili Murugan
 Dhivya as Aisha's sister
 Roxanne as Nasreen
 Harish Ram as Manoj
 Kovai Ajith
 John Samuel
 Walter Leeks
 Thiriyuvan
 Gayathri

Production 
It was reported in 2015 that Mithran Jawahar would direct the Tamil remake of Malayalam film Thattathin Marayathu. Newcomer Walter Philips and Isha Talwar was selected to reprise her role from original. The film's motion poster was released in February 2015.

Soundtrack 
G. V. Prakash Kumar composed the songs, while Na. Muthukumar and Thamarai wrote the lyrics. The music was released on 8 April 2016 by Sony Music India.

Release 
The first look (motion Picture) was released on 13 February 2015, The Teaser with runtime of 48 Seconds released on 19 April 2016. Theatrical Trailer with running length of 99 seconds released on 30 July 2016. The film, was first planned to release on 5 August 2016 later it was pushed to 26 August 2016.

References

External links 
 

2016 films
2010s Tamil-language films
Tamil remakes of Malayalam films
Films scored by G. V. Prakash Kumar
Indian interfaith romance films
Films directed by Mithran R. Jawahar